

References

Bibliography 
Rayfield, D. (2013) Edge of Empires: A History of Georgia, Reaktion Books, 
Toumanoff, C. (1990) The dynasties of Christian Caucasus from Antiquity to the 19th century: Genealogical and chronological tables, Rome

Bagrationi dynasty of the Kingdom of Imereti
Georgian family trees
Imereti Bagrationi dynasty